Joshua Tetlow (born 12 January 1998) is an English ice hockey player for RoKi and the British national team.

After coming through the Bracknell youth setup, he made his Bees IHC debut in the 2014/15 season. He signed for EIHL team Nottingham Panthers on a two-way deal with the Bees in the 2017/18 season. During his time in Nottingham, Tetlow would win the 2021 Elite Series.

On 13 May 2022, the Panthers announced that Tetlow would be leaving them to play in Europe for the 2022/23 season. It was subsequently announced that he had signed a one-year contract with Finnish second tier side RoKi.

He represented Great Britain at the 2021 and 2022 IIHF World Championship.

References

External links

1998 births
Living people
British expatriate ice hockey people
English expatriate sportspeople in Finland
English ice hockey defencemen
Nottingham Panthers players
Rovaniemen Kiekko players
Peterborough Phantoms players
People from Frimley